Arthur Victor Tobolsky (1919–1972) was a Professor in the Chemistry Department at Princeton University known for teaching and research in polymer science and rheology.

Personal 

Tobolsky was born in New York City in 1919.  
On September 7, 1972, Tobolsky died unexpectedly at the age of 53 on September 7, 1972 while attending a conference in Utica, N.Y.

Education 

Tobolsky graduated from Columbia in 1940, and received his PhD from Princeton in 1944. He studied under Henry Eyring and Hugh Stott Taylor.

Career 

Early in his career, he spent one year at the Brooklyn Polytechnic Institute.  After that, he spent his entire career in the Chemistry Department at Princeton.

Tobolsky made fundamental contributions in the fields of rheology, rubber elasticity, polymerization kinetics and thermodynamics, and polymer degradation.

He served on the Editorial Boards of American Scientist, the Journal of Polymer Science, and the Journal of Applied Physics.

Awards and Recognitions

 Witco Award in Polymer Chemistry from the American Chemical Society
 Ford Prize in Polymer Physics from the American Physical Society
 1956 — Bingham Medal of the Society of Rheology
 1966 — Fellow of the American Physical Society
 1970 — SPE International Award of the Society of Plastics Engineers

References 

Polymer scientists and engineers
1919 births
1972 deaths
20th-century American chemists
Fellows of the American Physical Society
Princeton University faculty